Swiss Super League/Challenge League playoffs is the play-offs round to determine promotion and relegation between Super League and Challenge League.

Results

2003
''see 2002/2003 football season in Switzerland#Nationalliga A/B Playoffs

2004

Neuchâtel Xamax remain in Super League

2005

FC Schaffhausen remain in Super League

2006

Neuchâtel Xamax relegated to Challenge League

2007

FC Aarau remain in Super League.

2008

 FC St. Gallen relegated to Challenge League

2009

FC Luzern remain in Super League

2010

AC Bellinzona remain in Super League

External links

Recurring sporting events established in 2003
2003 establishments in Switzerland
Swiss Super League
Swiss Challenge League